This article lists the Margraves and Electors of Brandenburg during the period of time that Brandenburg was a constituent state of the Holy Roman Empire.

The Mark, or March, of Brandenburg was one of the primary constituent states of the Holy Roman Empire.  It was created in 1157 as the Margraviate of Brandenburg by Albert the Bear, Margrave of the Northern March.  In 1356, by the terms of the Golden Bull of Charles IV, the Margrave of Brandenburg was given the permanent right to participate in the election of the Holy Roman Emperor with the title of Elector.

The early rulers came from several different dynasties, but from 1415 Brandenburg and its successor states were ruled by the House of Hohenzollern for over 500 years.  From 1618 onward, Brandenburg was ruled in personal union with the Duchy of Prussia.  The Hohenzollerns raised Prussia to a kingdom as the Kingdom of Prussia in 1701, and from then on Brandenburg was de facto treated as part of the kingdom even though it was legally still part of the Holy Roman Empire.  The titles of Margrave of Brandenburg and Elector of Brandenburg were abolished along with the Holy Roman Empire in 1806, and Brandenburg was formally integrated into Prussia. Despite this, the Prussian kings still included the title "Margrave of Brandenburg" in their royal style. From 1871 to 1918 the Hohenzollerns were also German Emperors.

Margraves and Electors of Brandenburg

House of Ascania

Partitions of Brandenburg under Ascanian rule

Table of rulers

House of Wittelsbach

Luxemburg Dynasty

House of Hohenzollern

Partitions of Brandenburg under Hohenzollern rule

Table of rulers
(Note: here, the numbering of the princes is the same for all principalities, as all were titled Margraves of Brandenburg, despite the different parts of land and its particular numbering of the rulers. The princes are numbered by the year of their succession.)

Titular Margraves of Brandenburg after 1806
This includes Kings of Prussia with the title of Margrave of Brandenburg (1806–1918) and pretenders to the throne of Prussia (1918–present)

Family tree

Upper Presidents of Brandenburg
In 1815 Brandenburg was constituted as the Prussian Province of Brandenburg without a sovereign ruler, but with Upper Presidents appointed by the central Prussian government. The upper president carried out central prerogatives on the provincial level and supervised the implementation of central policy on the lower levels of administration.

1815–1824: Georg Friedrich Christian von Heydebreck (1765–1828)
1825–1840: Friedrich Magnus von Bassewitz (1773–1858)
1840–1842: vacancy
1842–1848: August Werner von Meding (1792–1871)
1848–1849: Robert von Patow (1804–1890), per pro
1849–1850: vacancy
1849–1850: August Hermann Klemens Freiherr Wolff von Metternich (1803–1872), per pro
1850–1858: Eduard Heinrich von Flottwell (1786–1865)
1859–1862: Eduard Heinrich von Flottwell (1786–1865)
1862: Werner Ludolph Erdmann von Selchow (1806–1884)
1862–1879: Gustav Wilhelm von Jagow (1813–1879)
1879–1899: Heinrich von Achenbach (1829–1899)
1899–1905: Theobald von Bethmann Hollweg (1856–1921)
1905–1909: August von Trott zu Solz (1855–1938)
1909–1910: Friedrich Wilhelm von Loebell (1855–1931)
1910–1914: Alfred von Conrad (1852–1914)
1914–1917: Rudolf von der Schulenburg (1860–1930)
1917–1919: Friedrich Wilhelm von Loebell (1855–1931)
1919–1933: Adolf Maier (1871–1963)
1933–1936: Wilhelm Kube (1887–1943)
1937–1945: Emil Stürtz (1892–1945), since 1936 per pro

Land Directors of Brandenburg
Since 1875, with the strengthening of self-rule within the provinces, the urban and rural counties elected representatives for the provincial diets (Provinziallandtage). These parliaments legislated within the competences transferred to the provinces. The provincial diet of Brandenburg elected a provincial executive body (government), the provincial committee (Provinzialausschuss), and a head of province, the land director (Landesdirektor). Self-rule was abolished under the Nazi dictatorship.

1876–1896: Albert Erdmann Karl Gerhard von Levetzow (1827–1903), German Conservative Party
1896–1912: Otto Karl Gottlob von Manteuffel (1844–1913), German Conservative Party
1912–1930: Joachim von Winterfeldt-Menkin (1865–1945)
1930–1933: Hugo Swart (1885–1952)

Post-monarchy 

After the defeat of Nazi Germany in the Second World War, Brandenburg, which had previously been merely a province of Prussia, re-emerged as a German Land.

Prime Minister of Brandenburg, 1945–1952
 Karl Steinhoff (SPD/SED), 1945–1949.
 Rudolf Jahn (SED), 1949–1952.

After being abolished in a reorganization of the territories administered by the German Democratic Republic (East Germany), the Land Brandenburg was restored in the prelude to German unification in 1990.

Ministers President of Brandenburg, 1990 to date
 Manfred Stolpe (SPD), 1990–2002.
 Matthias Platzeck (SPD), 2002–2013
 Dietmar Woidke (SPD), since 2013.

Notes

See also
List of rulers of Prussia

 Rulers of Brandenburg, List of
 Rulers of Brandenburg, List of

Lists of German nobility
Lists of nobility of the Holy Roman Empire
 Rulers of Brandenburg, List of
Lists of European rulers
Lists of nobility
Nob